The Academy of Theatre and Dance is a faculty of the Amsterdam University of the Arts which was known as de Theaterschool until September 2016. It runs four year Bachelor's degree courses in theatre and dance, and two year Master's degree courses offered by DAS Graduate School. The staff of instructors and guest instructors amounts to about sixty persons, nearly all also in active in the theatrical and dance field.

History
The Amsterdamse Toneelschool was set up in 1874 and was at first established in the Marnixstraat 150. There Anna Sablariolles was registered as first pupil, and Maria Gartman as one of its first instructors. In 2001 it merged with the Kleinkunstacademie, founded in 1960 by Boris Blom

Alumni
:nl:Joop Admiraal
Karin Bloemen
Gijs Blom
Acda en de Munnik 
Javier Guzman 
Rutger Hauer
Katja Herbers
Jeroen Krabbé
Petra Laseur
:nl:Willem Nijholt
:nl:Ank van der Moer
Josine van Dalsum
Adriaan van Hees
Carice van Houten 
Kasper van Kooten 
Martine Sandifort
Henk van Ulsen
Ramses Shaffy
Aart Staartjes 
Stephen West
Rutger de Bekker, Diederik Ebbinge and Remko Vrijdag (better known as De Vliegende Panters)
Youp van 't Hek (expelled during his introductory period)

References

External links

Amsterdam University of the Arts
Drama schools in the Netherlands
Educational institutions established in 1874
1874 establishments in the Netherlands